This is a list of notable people who were born in the Channel Island of Jersey, or have been resident there, including current Jersey residents.

Some persons may not be listed here, but are listed in other related articles, shown under the See also section.

All those listed should have an article dedicated to them.

Actors

Henry Cavill, actor (born 1983)
Anthony Faramus, actor and author, (1920–1990)
Seymour Hicks, actor (1871–1949)
Tonicha Jeronimo, English actress (born 1977)
Jonny Labey, actor (born 1993)
Lillie Langtry, actress (1853–1929)
Sylvestra Le Touzel, actor (born 1958)
Will Smith, British comedian, actor and writer (born 1971)
Alma Stanley, actress, (1854–1931) 
Ivy St. Helier, actress, (1886–1971)

Architects
Edward Bartley, architect (1839–1919)

Artists

Edmund Blampied, artist (1886–1966)
Claude Cahun, artist (1894–1954) 
Philip Jean, painter (1755–1802)
John St Helier Lander, portrait painter (1868–1944)
John Le Capelain, painter (1812–1848)
Jason Martin, painter (born 1970)
Caroline Osborne, Duchess of Leeds (1931–2005)
Walter William Ouless RA, painter (1848–1933)
Charles H. Poingdestre, painter (1825–1905)
Reginald Hector Whistler, artist (1905–1978)

Athletes

Mariana Agathangelou, badminton player, (born 1988)
Matt Banahan, rugby player (born 1986)
Karina Bisson, lawn and indoor bowler (born 1966)
Alex Buesnel, disabled gymnast (born 1992)
Daryl Clare, footballer (born 1978)
Malcolm De Sousa, lawn and indoor bowler (born 1991)
Suzie Dingle, lawn and indoor bowler (born 1958)
Nathan Frazer, professional wrestler (born 1998)
Phil Gaudin, professional golfer (born 1879) 
Albert Geary, cricketer (1900–1989)
Christine Grimes, lawn and indoor bowler  (born 1950)
Kurtis Guthrie, footballer (born 1993)
Serena Guthrie, netballer (born 1990)
Chris Hamon, footballer (born 1970)
Dave Huson, footballer (born 1951)
Simon Laurens, equestrian (born 1967)
Michael Le Bourgeois, rugby player (born 1990)
Graeme Le Saux, football player (born 1968)
Fred Leamon, footballer (1919–1981)
Nigel Mansell, racing driver (born 1953)
Gean O'Neil, lawn and indoor bowler (born 1951) 
Robert Osborne-Smith, cricketer (1908–1972)
Brett Pitman, football player (born 1988)
Ted Ray, professional golfer (1877–1943)
Thomas Renouf, professional golfer (1878–1955)
Scott Ruderham, lawn and indoor bowler (born 1988)
George Scoones, footballer (born 1886)
Lauryn Therin, track cyclist (b. 19 January 1986) 
Peter Tregloan, powerlifter (born 1957)
Harry Vardon, professional golfer (1870–1937)
Peter Vincenti, footballer (born 1986)
Geoff Vowden, footballer (born 1941)
James Walker, racing driver (born 1983)
Derek Warwick, racing driver, businessman (born 1954)
Claire Wilson, runner (born c. 1986)

Business people

Billy Butlin, holiday camp empire, moved to Jersey in 1972 (1899–1980)
David Kirch, property developer, collector and philanthropist (born 1936)
Jean Martell, Jersey-born founder of cognac manufacturer Martell and responsible for establishing brandy trade routes with Guernsey (1694–1753)
Simon Nixon, founder of Moneysupermarket.com, moved to Jersey in 2013 (born 1967)
Charles Robin, developed, with brother John, the fishery in the Canadian maritime region (1743–1824)
Jack Walker, British industrialist and businessman (1929–2000)

Criminals
Francis Joseph Huchet, murderer (d. 1959, aged 32)
Edward Paisnel, sex offender (1925–1994)

Linguists
Geraint Jennings, linguist, politician (born 1966)

Musicians

Dave Adams, musician (1938–2016)
Andy Chatterley, record producer, songwriter (born 1973)
John Wort Hannam, folk musician
Guru Josh, house musician (1964–2015)
Gerard Le Feuvre, cellist (born 1962)
Steve Lodder, keyboardist, composer and organist (born 1951)
Gilbert O'Sullivan, singer-songwriter (born 1946)
Nerina Pallot, singer-songwriter (born 1974)
Kevin Porée, record producer, musician (born 1965)

Rulers, politicians, soldiers

Fleur Anderson, British Labour politician
Francis George Atkinson, First District Officer in Jesselton, British North Borneo (1874–1902)
John George Bourinot, merchant and politician in Nova Scotia (1814–1884)
William Bruce, Lieutenant (1890–1914)
Cecil Burney, Admiral of the Fleet (1858–1929)
George Carteret, vice-admiral, royalist statesman (1610–1680)
Henry Seymour Conway, British general, statesman in England and Governor of Jersey,  (1721–1795)
Philippe d'Auvergne, British Vice Admiral, spymaster and Duc de Bouillon (1754–1816)
Renaud De Carteret III, land-owner (1129–1169)
Bertram Falle, 1st Baron Portsea, politician, barrister (1859–1948)
Augustus Asplet Le Gros, politician, writer (1840–1887)
Cyril Le Marquand, politician (1902–1980)
John Le Marquand, politician (1912–2008)
Isaac LeVesconte, Nova Scotia businessman and politician (1822–1879)
Sarah Pallett, member of the New Zealand Parliament
Walter Raleigh, Governor from 1600 to 1603
William Villiers, 10th Earl of Jersey, peer, film producer (born 1976)
Roger Walden, English treasurer and church figure (died 1406)

Scientists

 Steve A. Kay, chronobiologist   
Gerald Durrell, naturalist, author (1925–1995)
Lee McGeorge Durrell, naturalist, author (born 1949)
Robert Le Rossignol, chemist (1884–1976)
Robert Ranulph Marett, ethnologist, (1866–1943), son of Robert Pipon Marett

Television and radio personalities
Eric Blakeley, TV presenter (born 1965)
Gary Burgess, TV and radio presenter (1975–2022)
Alan Whicker, TV presenter (1921–2013)

Writers
Rosie Boycott, Baroness Boycott, journalist and feminist (born 1951)
Daniel Brevint, author and clergyman (1616–1695)
Gary Burgess, journalist
Babette Cole, children's writer and illustrator (1950–2017)
George William de Carteret, journalist and writer, (1869–1940)

Jean Dorey, Norman language writer (1831–1872)
Roger Drew, screenwriter (born 1971)
Gerald Durrell, conservationist, author (1925–1995)
Elinor Glyn, novelist, scriptwriter (1864–1943)
Sir William Haley, newspaper editor and broadcasting administrator (1901–1987)
Victor Hugo, exiled in Jersey (1802–1885)
John Conroy Hutcheson, author (1840–1896/1897)
Frederick Lonsdale, dramatist (1881–1954)
Robert Marett, British author and diplomat, (1907–1981)
Robert Pipon Marett, lawyer, journalist, poet, politician (1820–1884)
Harry Patterson, author (1929-2022)
Amélia Perchard, Jèrriais-language writer (1921–2012)
Jeremy Reed, poet, novelist, biographer and literary critic (born 1951)
Wace, mediaeval author (1100–1174)

Other notables

Philip Carteret, British naval officer and explorer (1733–1796)
Eddie Chapman, double agent (1914–1997)
Daniel Dumaresq, Anglican priest and educational consultant to Russia and Poland (1712–1805)
Anthony Faramus, prisoner of war, actor (1920–1990)
Duncan Gibbons, (1952 - 1993) film and music video director
Louisa Gould, World War II resistance who assisted Russian prisoners in Jersey (1891 – 1945)
Norman Le Brocq, World War II resistance leader, and Deputy (1922–1996)
Tim Le Cocq, Bailiff
Alphonse Le Gastelois, hermit (1914–2012)
Bob Le Sueur, assisted Russian prisoners in Jersey (born 1922)
Caroline LeSueur, Mormon pioneer (1814–1898)
Robert MacRae, Deputy Bailiff
Marguerite Stocker (1901-1992) engineering apprentice in First World War, governor of HM Prison Askham Grange 1959–1967.

See also
Lieutenant Governor of Jersey
List of Bailiffs of Jersey
List of politicians in Jersey
Sport in Jersey
List of people from Guernsey

References

 
Jersey
Jersey
People
People